The 2022 Navajo Nation presidential election took place on Tuesday, November 8th, 2022 to elect the president and vice president of the Navajo Nation. The primary election was held on August 2nd. Incumbent president Jonathan Nez ran for reelection with attorney Chad Abeyta as his running mate. Incumbent Vice President Myron Lizer did not seek re-election, instead running for U.S. House in Arizona. Nez and Abeyta advanced to the general election, as did the challenging ticket of construction manager Buu Nygren and Torreon/Star Lake Chapter President Richelle Montoya. Nygren and Montoya won the general election by a 6-point margin, and Montoya became the Navajo Nation's first female vice president.

Candidates

Advanced to general election
Jonathan Nez, incumbent president (Party affiliation: Democratic)
Chad Abeyta, attorney for the Navajo Nation Office of Legislative Counsel
Buu Nygren, former Navajo Engineering and Construction Authority chief commercial officer, husband of Arizona state representative Jasmine Blackwater-Nygren, and candidate for vice president in 2018 (Party affiliation: Democratic)
Richelle Montoya, president of the Torreon/Star Lake Chapter

Eliminated in primary
Greg Bigman, chair of the Diné College Board of Regents
Dineh Benally, former member of the San Juan Chapter Farm Board and candidate for president in 2018
Ethel Branch, former Attorney General of the Navajo Nation (2015–2019)
Kevin Cody, tribal employee, environmental science student, and candidate for president in 2018
Frankie Davis, activist and granddaughter of former Navajo Nation Councillor Mescalito Nelson
Frank Dayish, former vice president of the Navajo Nation (2003–2007)
Emily Ellison, family shelter director and candidate for president in 2018
Sandra Jeff, former New Mexico state representative (2009–2015) (Party affiliation: Libertarian)
Justin Jones, attorney
Rosanna Jumbo-Fitch, president of the Chinle Chapter
Dolly Manson, educator
Earl Sombrero, Ts'ah Bii' Kin Chapter manager
Leslie Tsosie, scholar

Results

Primary election

General election

References

Navajo Nation presidential
Navajo Nation elections
Navajo Nation presidential
Navajo Nation presidential